Raven's Home is an American family sitcom television series developed by Jed Elinoff and Scott Thomas that premiered on Disney Channel on July 21, 2017. The series stars Raven-Symoné, Issac Ryan Brown, Navia Robinson, Jason Maybaum, Sky Katz, Anneliese van der Pol, Mykal-Michelle Harris, Felix Avitia, Emmy Liu-Wang, and Rondell Sheridan.

Based on the characters created by Michael Poryes and Susan Sherman, the series is a spinoff of That's So Raven, the second spinoff from that series after Cory in the House. The series centers around Raven Baxter, a divorced mother of preteen twins Booker and Nia, living with her childhood best friend Chelsea and her son Levi in Chicago, Illinois. The fifth season has Raven and Booker relocating to San Francisco after Raven's father Victor had a mild heart attack.

Series overview

Episodes

Season 1 (2017)

Season 2 (2018)

Season 3 (2019–20)

Season 4 (2020–21)

Season 5 (2022)

Notes

References 

Lists of American children's television series episodes
Lists of American sitcom episodes
Lists of Disney Channel television series episodes